Spodoptera hipparis is a species of cutworm or dart moth in the family Noctuidae. It is found in North America.

The MONA or Hodges number for Spodoptera hipparis is 9674.

References

Further reading

 
 
 

Spodoptera
Articles created by Qbugbot
Moths described in 1889